State Route 23 (SR 23) is a  state highway that travels south-to-north through portions of Charlton, Brantley, Wayne, Long, Tattnall, Candler, Emanuel, Jenkins, and Burke counties in the southeastern and east-central parts of the U.S. state of Georgia. The highway connects the Florida state line, south-southwest of Saint George with the southern part of the Augusta metropolitan area, via Folkston, Nahunta, Jesup, Ludowici, Glennville, Reidsville, Metter, Twin City, and Millen.

SR 23's original segment was from Statesboro to Millen. It was shifted westward and was incrementally extended in both directions to each of its current termini.

Route description

Florida to Reidsville
SR 23 begins at the Florida state line west-northwest of the southernmost point in the state, in Charlton County. South-southeast of here, the roadway continues as State Road 121, which travels to Macclenny, Florida. North-northwest of here, SR 23 travels concurrent with SR 121 on Okefenokee Parkway. Almost immediately, they meet the southern terminus of SR 185. A short distance later, the two highways curve to the northeast. Then, they curve to the north-northwest and enter Saint George. In town, they have an intersection with SR 94 (Moniac Road). The concurrent highways continue to the north-northwest, through rural areas of the county and then curve to the northeast. After that, they enter Folkston, to an intersection with US 1/US 23/US 301/SR 4/SR 15 (2nd Street North). The six highways travel to the north-northwest concurrently. Along the Folkston–Homeland city line, which travels through the large intersection, US 301/SR 23 continue straight ahead, while US 1/US 23/SR 4/SR 15 travel to the northwest. Then, US 301/SR 23 gradually curve to the north-northeast and enter Brantley County. The concurrency enters Nahunta, where it intersects US 82/SR 520 (Cleveland Street). Then, they intersect SR 32 in Hortense, just before entering Wayne County. Just before entering Jesup, they pass by Jesup–Wayne County Airport and Pine Forest Country Club. In town, they intersect US 25/US 341/SR 27 (East Cherry Street). At this intersection, US 25 joins the concurrency. The three highways curve to the north-northwest and intersect US 84/SR 38 (North 1st Street), which join the concurrency. Immediately, the five highways travel north-northeast and then leave town. Just under  later, they curve to the northeast. Then, they pass by an industrial waste pond of Rayonier just before crossing over the Altamaha River into Long County. In Ludowici, they intersect SR 57 (Mc Donald Street). At this intersection, US 84/SR 38 split off to the northeast on Cypress Street, while US 25/US 301/SR 23/SR 57 travel to the northwest. The concurrent highways begin a curve to the north-northwest and cross over Beards Creek into Tattnall County. After they meet the western terminus of SR 196, they curve to the north-northeast and enter Glennville. At Barnard Street, they intersect SR 144, and SR 23/SR 57 split off to the northwest. A little over  later, SR 144 splits off to the west-southwest on Hencart Road, while SR 23/SR 57 pass by Kicks Playland and leave town. To the northwest, they intersect SR 169. A little farther along, SR 121 rejoins the concurrency. The three highways enter Reidsville.

Reidsville to northern terminus
In Reidsville, SR 23/SR 57/SR 121 intersect US 280/SR 30 (Brazell Street). Before leaving town, they curve to a nearly due-north routing. After that, they curve to the north-northeast and enter Collins, where they intersect SR 292 (Manassas Street). SR 23/SR 57/SR 121 curve to the north-northwest and enter Cobbtown. In town, they meet the eastern terminus of SR 152 (New Cobbtown Road). Approximately  later, SR 57 continues straight ahead, while SR 23/SR 121 curve to the northeast and leave town just before entering Candler County. In Metter, they have an interchange with Interstate 16 (I-16; Jim Gillis Historic Savannah Parkway). In the main part of town, they intersect SR 46 (Broad Street). At this intersection, SR 23 splits off to the west, concurrent with SR 46 for a few blocks, while SR 121 continues straight ahead. At College Street, SR 23 splits off to the north-northeast and gradually curves to the northwest. It passes Candler County Hospital. Just after leaving town, it passes Willow Lake Golf Club and Byrd Cemetery. Farther to the northwest, the highway enters Emanuel County and crosses into the city limits of Twin City. In town, is an intersection with SR 192. At this intersection, SR 23 turns to the right and travels to the northeast. Then, it intersects US 80/SR 26. Just before leaving town, the route passes by Twin City Cemetery. After traveling through Garfield, it enters Jenkins County. The highway passes through rural areas of the county, curves to the east-southeast, and intersects US 25/SR 67/SR 121. The four highways head concurrently to the north-northeast. Then, they curve to the northeast and cross over the Ogeechee River just before entering Millen. In town, they intersect SR 17 Byp. (South Gray Street), which joins the concurrency. The five highways curve to a nearly due-north routing and intersect SR 17 (West Winthrope Avenue). At this intersection, SR 17 Byp. meets its northern terminus and US 25/SR 121 continue straight ahead, while SR 23/SR 67 turn right and follow SR 17 south. At Masonic Street, SR 17 and SR 23 split off to different directions, while SR 67 continues to the east. At Jordan Avenue, SR 23 curves to the northeast. Just after leaving town, it intersects SR 21 (Millen Bypass). Farther to the northeast, it crosses over Beaverdam Creek into Burke County. In Sardis, it intersects SR 24 (Charles Perry Avenue). In Girard, the highway begins a northwesterly routing. The highway enters Shell Bluff, where it intersects SR 80. Then, it passes Hagler Lake before meeting its northern terminus, an intersection with SR 56, just south of Augusta.

National Highway System
The following portions of SR 23 part of the National Highway System, a system of routes determined to be the most important for the nation's economy, mobility, and defense:
 The Folkston–Homeland segment (concurrent with US 1/US 23/US 301/SR 4/SR 15)
 The Jesup–Ludowici segment (mostly concurrent with US 84/US 301/SR 38)
 The section concurrent with US 25/SR 67/SR 121 southwest of Millen and into the city

History

1920s
SR 23 was established at least as early as 1919 on a different alignment than it travels today. It extended from SR 26 in Statesboro to SR 21 in Millen. At this time, SR 38 was established on SR 23's current path from Jesup to Ludowici. Also, an unnumbered road was established from SR 30 in Reidsville to SR 26 in Metter. By the end of September 1921, the original path of SR 23 from Statesboro to Millen was shifted westward, to travel from SR 26 in Metter to SR 21 in Millen; this placed SR 23 on a concurrency with SR 26 from Metter to Graymont, the old name of Twin City. SR 23's former path was redesignated as portions of SR 46 and SR 67. SR 23 was extended southward to SR 30 in Reidsville, with a very brief concurrency with SR 30 there, then southeast to SR 25 in Darien. By October 1926, SR 38's crossing over the Altamaha River, between Jesup and Ludowici, was indicated to have "no bridge or ferry". Also, US 17 was designated on SR 25 in Darien.

1930s
In the second half of 1930, US 25 designated on SR 23 south-southwest of Millen. By the beginning of 1932, SR 38's crossing over Altamaha River was indicated to have a bridge. US 280 was designated on the portion of SR 23 in Reidsville. In April 1932, the path of SR 23 from Darien to Ludowici was shifted southwestward. SR 23 then extended southwest on SR 38 from Ludowici to Jesup, then on a sole path south-southwest to US 1/SR 4 in Folkston. The former path of SR 23 was redesignated as SR 99. In the first quarter of 1937, the southern terminus of SR 23 was extended west-southwest from Folkston and south to Saint George. At the end of the year, it was extended again: south-southwest to the Florida state line. The next year, SR 23 was truncated to SR 94 in Saint George. By the middle of 1939, US 25 designated on the Jesup–Glennville segment. Also, the northern terminus of SR 23 was extended northeast to SR 24 in Sardis. At least as early as 1939, an unnumbered road was established northeast from Sardis to Girard, then northwest to SR 56 north-northeast of Waynesboro.

1940s to 1980s
At the end of 1940, SR 23's southern terminus was re-extended south-southwest to the Florida state line. Between November 1946 and February 1948, US 301 was designated on the Folkston–Glennville segment. Between July 1957 and June 1960, SR 23 was extended on this road. At this time, the entire length of the highway was paved. By June 1963, SR 121 was extended on the path of SR 23 from Homeland to the Florida state line. SR 121 was also designated on SR 23 from southeast of Reidsville to Metter. In 1985, SR 57 was designated on SR 23 from Ludowici to Cobbtown.

Major intersections

Special routes

Glennville connector route

State Route 23 Connector (SR 23 Conn.) was a connector route of SR 23 that existed entirely within the city limits of Glennville. Between February 1948 and April 1949, it was established from SR 23 in the northwestern part of the city to US 25/US 301/SR 73 in the northern part of the city. In 1985, this connector was decommissioned.

Twin City spur route

State Route 23 Spur (SR 23 Spur) is a  spur route of SR 23 that exists entirely within the southeastern part of Emanuel County and travels completely within the city limits of Twin City. The highway is known as 5th Avenue for its entire length.

It begins at an intersection with the SR 23 mainline in the southwestern part of town. It travels one block to meet its northern terminus, an intersection with SR 192.

SR 23 Spur is not part of the National Highway System, a system of roadways important to the nation's economy, defense, and mobility.

Between the beginning of 1940 and the beginning of 1953, SR 23 Spur was established from SR 23 at what is its current southern terminus to US 80/SR 26. By the beginning of 1975, it was truncated to its current length. Its former path was redesignated as a western rerouting of SR 192. The former path of SR 192 was redesignated as SR 192 Spur.

See also
 
 
 Central Savannah River Area

References

External links

 
 Georgia Roads (Routes 21 - 40)

023
Transportation in Charlton County, Georgia
Transportation in Brantley County, Georgia
Transportation in Wayne County, Georgia
Transportation in Long County, Georgia
Transportation in Tattnall County, Georgia
Transportation in Candler County, Georgia
Transportation in Emanuel County, Georgia
Transportation in Jenkins County, Georgia
Transportation in Burke County, Georgia